Ahmed Chibane (born 3 March 1917, date of death unknown) was an Algerian racing cyclist. He rode in the 1947 Tour de France.

References

External links

1917 births
Year of death missing
Algerian male cyclists
Sportspeople from Algiers